Kirarin Revolution Stage 3  is the second season of Kirarin Revolution and a direct continuation of the first season. It aired on TV Tokyo from April 8, 2008 to March 27, 2009, for a total of 51 episodes. The show was animated by SynergySP and SimImage in 3D animation and HD format.

The show introduced Noel Yukino and Kobeni Hanasaki to the main cast, two original characters played by Sayaka Kitahara and You Kikkawa from Hello Pro Egg. The voice actors for Seiji Hiwatari and Hiroto Kazama were replaced with Shikou Kanai and Takuya Ide.

All opening theme songs were performed by Koharu Kusumi, Sayaka Kitahara, and You Kikkawa under the name MilkyWay, a Japanese idol girl group featured in the show. In addition, Kusumi continued to perform some of the ending themes under the name .

The opening theme songs include "Anataboshi" from episodes 103-128 and "Tan Tan Tān!" from episodes 129-153, both performed by MilkyWay. The ending theme songs include "SanSan GoGo" by MilkyWay from episodes 103-155; "Pa-Pancake" by Kusumi from episodes 116-128; "Gamushalala" by MilkyWay from episodes 129-141; and "Happy Happy Sunday!" by Kusumi from episodes 142-153.

Episode list

Home media

References

2008 Japanese television seasons
2009 Japanese television seasons
Kirarin Revolution
Lists of anime episodes